Patricia Teherán Romero (10 June 1969 Cartagena de Indias – 19 January 1995 Loma de Arena, Santa Catalina) was a Colombian singer and composer, considered the most important female vocalist in the history of vallenato.

Career 
In 1988, she was discovered by Graciela Ceballos, who invited her to be part of a new musical project consisting only of women, which became known as Las Musas del Vallenato, with whom she recorded three LPs. The last of these, called Explosivas y Sexys, marked the end of her collaboration with Las Musas and the beginning of a new project called Las Diosas del Vallenato.

Patricia Teherán composed her first song, titled "Dueño de mi pasión", for the album Con aroma de mujer.

Death 
The car that she was riding in from Barranquilla to Cartagena after signing the participation of the Goddesses of Vallenato in the Carnival of Barranquilla, when at 4:30 in the afternoon, at Loma de Arena, one of the tires exploded and the vehicle moving at high speed lost control, resulting in the vehicle overturning.

Discography

Con Alma de mujer (1990) with Las Musas del Vallenato 

 01 - Embriagada de ilusiones
 02 - Seña rara (Sergio Castro).
 03 - Sueños fallidos (Jorge Hasbún).
 04 - Mentira (Alberto Urrego).
 05 - Alma de mujer (Julia Regina Puello).
 06 - El invierno y tú (Pedro Pérez).
 07 - No dejes (Joaquín Torres).
 08 - Acabaron lo nuestro (Pedro Pablo Peña).
 09 - Defendamos nuestro amor (Víctor Méndez).
 10 - Contigo y sin ti (Ever Sierra).

Guerreras del Amor (1991) with Las Musas del Vallenato 

 01 - No vale la pena sentir (José Alfonso "Chiche" Maestre).
 02 - Muchas gracias, Cartagena (Romualdo Brito).
 03 - Por qué, mi amor (Miguel Morales).
 04 - Todo pasa (Rosendo Romero).
 05 - Castillo de flores (Otto Medina).
 06 - Me dejaste sin nada (Omar Geles).
 07 - La guerrera del amor (Romualdo Brito).
 08 - Triste y sola (Sergio Amarís).
 09 - Aclárame ya (Osman Maestre).
 10 - Lejos de ti (Miguel Anillo).

Explosivas y Sexys (1993) with Las Musas del Vallenato 

 01 - Qué desastre (Rafael Escobar).
 02 - Otro en tu lugar (Jorge Valbuena).
 03 - A mi gente canto (Romualdo Brito).
 04 - Tú dónde estás (Rafael Brito).
 05 - Siempre cerca (Miguel Cujia).
 06 - Me acostumbre a tus besos (Omar Geles).
 07 - El viento en tus alas (Efrén Calderón).
 08 - Más vale ser amigos (Miguel Morales).
 09 - El amor que soñé (Luis Egurrola).
 10 - Bendita inocencia (Ricardo Paut)

Con aroma de mujer (1994) 

 01. Tarde lo conocí (Omar Geles)
 02. Amor de papel (Romualdo Brito)
 03. Eres todo de mí (Jorge Valbuena)
 04. Enamórate de mí (Gabriel Hinestroza)
 05. Acaso no me crees (Aurelio Nuñez)
 06. Todo daría por ti (Jorge Celedón)
 07. Siempre conmigo (Franklin Moya)
 08. Volví a fallar (Fabián Corrales)
 09. Dueño de mi pasión (Patricia Teherán)
 10. Endulzame la vida (Iván Ovalle)

Adiós a la Diosa (1995) 

 01.Todo daría por ti (Jorge Celedón)
 02.Cambiare (Omar Geles)
 03.Voy a esperarte (Rafael Brito)
 04.Me dejaste sin nada (Omar Geles)
 05.Acaso no me crees (Aurelio Nuñez)
 06.Así lo quisiste (Luis Duyoner)
 07.Tarde lo conocí (Omar Geles)
 08.Que desastre (Rafael Escobar)
 09.Vete y no vuelvas (Guadis Carrasco)
 10.Amor de papel (Romualdo Brito)
 11.Donde estarás sin mí (Graciela Ceballos)
 12.Volví a fallar (Fabián Corrales)

References 

20th-century Colombian women singers
People from Cartagena, Colombia
Vallenato musicians
1969 births
1995 deaths
Road incident deaths in Colombia
Colombian composers
Women in Latin music